Sara López Ravetllat (born 29 November 1992) is a Spanish competitive sailor. She competed at the 2016 Summer Olympics in Rio de Janeiro, in the women's 470 class.

References

1992 births
Living people
Spanish female sailors (sport)
Olympic sailors of Spain
Sailors at the 2016 Summer Olympics – 470